The Greenwood Pirates were a minor league baseball team in Greenwood, South Carolina, from 1981 to 1983. The team was an affiliate of the Pittsburgh Pirates in the South Atlantic League. The club lasted three seasons before moving to Savannah, Georgia to become the Savannah Cardinals. The Pittsburgh Pirates then affiliated themselves with the Macon Pirates.

Season results

Baseball teams established in 1981
Baseball teams disestablished in 1983
Defunct South Atlantic League teams
Pittsburgh Pirates minor league affiliates
Professional baseball teams in South Carolina
1981 establishments in South Carolina
1983 disestablishments in South Carolina
Defunct baseball teams in South Carolina
Greenwood, South Carolina